The Women's 400 metre freestyle competition of the 2018 European Aquatics Championships was held on 9 August 2018.

Records
Prior to the competition, the existing world and championship records were as follows.

Results

Heats
The heats were started at 09:24.

Final
The final was started at 17:50.

References

Women's 400 metre freestyle